Tek Bahadur Gurung is a member of Nepali Congress, assumed the post of the Minister for Labour and Employment of Nepal on 25 February 2014 under Sushil Koirala-led government.

He is a member of the 2nd Nepalese Constituent Assembly. He won the Manang–1 seat in 2013 Nepalese Constituent Assembly election from the Nepali Congress.

Personal life
Tek Bahadur Gurung was born on 26 November 1954 in Tanki-3, Manang, Nepal to Kazi Gurung and Pulama Gurung. He has acquired school education up to Grade 10.
He is the founder chairperson of Manang Marsyandi Club and also a producer of a celluloid film – Jhhuma. He has two sons and two daughters.
One of his son is businessman Karma Bahadur Gurung

Political career
Gurung started his political career in 1979 from Nepali Congress. He was also a district chairperson of Nepali Congress of Manang District.

References

1954 births
Living people
People from Manang District, Nepal
Nepali Congress politicians from Gandaki Province
Government ministers of Nepal
Nepalese film producers
Gurung people
Members of the 2nd Nepalese Constituent Assembly
Nepal MPs 2022–present